Bastián Ignacio Tapia Sepúlveda (born 9 August 2002) is a Chilean professional footballer who plays as a centre-back for Chilean Primera División side Audax Italiano.

Club career
Tapia joined Universidad de Chile youth system in 2017 and made his professional debut playing for Deportes Iquique in the Primera B de Chile while he was on loan in the 2021 season. Once he returned to Universidad de Chile, he took part in the 2022 Summer International Tournament played in Argentina, making appearances in the matches against Colo-Colo and Boca Juniors.

International career
He represented Chile U20 in a friendly tournament played in Teresópolis, Brazil, called Granja Comary International Tournament, playing all the matches and scoring a goal against Peru U20, Bolivia U20, and Brazil U20.

References

External links
 
 Bastián Tapia at playmakerstats.com (English version of ceroacero.es)

2002 births
Living people
People from Antofagasta
Chilean footballers
Chile under-20 international footballers
Association football forwards
Universidad de Chile footballers
Deportes Iquique footballers
Chilean Primera División players
Primera B de Chile players